Loch Ness is a 1996 family drama film starring Ted Danson and Joely Richardson. It was written by John Fusco and directed by John Henderson.

Plot
At Loch Ness, Scotland, scientist Dr. Abernathy is killed by slipping off some rocks, after seeing something in the loch and taking a single photograph of it. Months later, American zoologist and freshman college tutor, Dr. John Dempsey, is asked to replace Abernathy and dispel the myth of the Loch Ness Monster. Dempsey is reluctant to do so, having ruined his career by trying to prove the existence of the Sasquatch. He agrees to go for the money, which would allow him to pay alimony to his ex-wife that ran off and pay an IRS debt, naming a newly discovered species of parasitic wasp after her.

Arriving in Scotland, Dempsey meets Dr. Abernathy's assistant Adrian Foote, who fanatically believes in the monster. Dempsey rents a room at a local inn run by Laura McFetridge and her young daughter, Isabel, who grows close to him. He soon meets the other locals, fisherman Andy McLean, who aggressively comes to see Dempsey as a rival for Laura's affections; eccentric Gordon Shoals, who claims the monster is his property; and the Water Bailiff, who is highly protective of the legend, and tries to repeatedly sabotage Dempsey's efforts.

Using state-of-the-art technology, Dempsey scans the whole loch, and is unable to find any trace of the monster. When he declares the end of the myth, Adrian angrily berates him, but Dempsey admits he wants to find the dinosaur to rebuild his career, left cynical by his failure to find the Sasquatch. Dempsey later receives Dr. Abernathy's camera, discovering the photo he took on the night he died – revealing it shows a dinosaur's flipper. He and Adrian venture out to search the loch again. After tracking a 40-foot-long object, it collides with and sinks the boat. Dempsey nearly drowns, but is rescued by an unseen creature, and the Water Bailiff. A thrilled Dempsey claims to have seen the monster.

Andy assaults Dempsey for his relationship with Laura, but she defends him. Isabel gives him a get well card, with a drawing of what she calls a “water kelpie” on it. Realising she, too, has seen the monster, Dempsey convinces Isabel to show him where it lives, and he will buy her a red bicycle she has always wanted. Isabel leads him to a cavern beneath Urquhart Castle, where they encounter a family of plesiosaur and elasmosaur hybrids. Isabel can communicate with them through a series of whistles. In astonished euphoria, Dempsey takes photographs of the monsters, frightening them, and knocking Isabel into the water. He saves her, but is confronted by the Water Bailiff.

Dempsey is kicked out of the inn by a furious Laura, and Isabel is deeply hurt by his betrayal. Dempsey and Adrian travel to London to publicly reveal the dinosaurs’ existence. Dempsey meets the Water Bailiff on the train, imploring him to not reveal the truth. Dempsey reasons that exposure and science would help the creatures, but the Water Bailiff points out how it was Isabel and her faith, not science, that led him to the dinosaurs.

At a conference at the Natural History Museum, Dempsey is unable to go through with the presentation, replacing his photographs with Isabel's kelpie drawing. On the way out, Dempsey informs Adrian that he fabricated his photographs before coming to Scotland, but Adrian, knowing the truth, understands. The Water Bailiff returns to Loch Ness, discovering Dempsey slipped his photographs into his bag during their conversation on the train. Dempsey returns to the inn, reuniting with Laura and Isabel, bringing the new bicycle with him. The plesiosaurs swim through the loch, accompanied by an infant.

Cast
 Ted Danson as Dr. Jonathan Dempsey
 Joely Richardson as Laura McFetridge
 Kirsty Graham as Isabel McFetridge
 Ian Holm as Water Bailiff
 Harris Yulin as Dr. Robert Mercer
 James Frain as Adrian Foote
 Keith Allen as Gordon Shoals
 Nick Brimble as Andy McLean
 Phillip O'Brien as Dr. Abernathy
 Edward Hibbert as Scientist (Cameo)

Production notes
Screenwriter John Fusco wrote the screenplay when he was 23 years old as a tribute to his Scottish grandmother Isabel Moffat. In the film, the young girl's name is Isabel and she resides at the Moffat Arms Inn.

Locations
Although partly shot around Loch Ness in Scotland, the external hotel and village scenes, where most of the story takes place, were filmed at Lower Diabaig on the west coast of Highland. The internal scenes of the conference room and the hotel lobby area were shot at John Nike OBE DL's Coppid Beech Hotel in Binfield, Bracknell, Berkshire, England.

Soundtrack
The film score by Trevor Jones was released on Perseverance Records 9 September 2005.  Originally Rod Stewart's 1991 song "Rhythm of My Heart" was used during the closing credits of the film, however that is not the version heard on this CD. According to Jones in the CD's liner notes:
"Rhythm of My Heart" is performed here by an artist who could not be identified and not Rod Stewart as in the film. 
The version on the CD is actually a cover of the song by the Scottish band Runrig that first appeared on their 1996 compilation album "Long Distance".

Box office
The film opened on 9 February 1996 on 179 screens in the United Kingdom and grossed £567,274 for the weekend finishing fourth at the UK box office. It went on to gross £2.6 million.

Awards          
Starboy Award, 1996, Oulu International Children's Film Festival.

See also
 Magic in the Water (1995)
 Mee-Shee: The Water Giant (2005)
 The Water Horse: Legend of the Deep (2007)

References

External links 
 

1996 films
1996 fantasy films
British fantasy films
Films set in Scotland
Films about cryptids
Working Title Films films
PolyGram Filmed Entertainment films
Gramercy Pictures films
Metro-Goldwyn-Mayer films
Films shot at Pinewood Studios
Loch Ness Monster in film
Films produced by Eric Fellner
Films produced by Tim Bevan
Films scored by Trevor Jones
Films with screenplays by John Fusco
Films directed by John Henderson (director)
1990s English-language films
1990s British films